Nona is a feminine given name or nickname. It may refer to:

 Saint Nona, a Christian saint of whom little is known
 Nona Balakian (1918–1991), Armenian-American literary critic and an editor 
 Nona L. Brooks (1861–1945), leader in the New Thought movement
 Nona Byrne (1922–2012), British Roman Catholic philanthropist
 Nona Fernández (born 1971), Chilean actress, author, and screenwriter
 Nona Freeman (1916–2009), evangelist, author and missionary
 Nona Gaprindashvili (born 1941), Georgian chess player
 Nona Gaye (born 1974), African-American singer, fashion model and screen actress, daughter of Motown singer Marvin Gaye
 Nona Hendryx (born 1944), member of the R&B group LaBelle
 Nona Willis-Aronowitz (born 1984), American author and editor

Feminine given names